Callicrates ( mid-5th century BC) was an ancient Greek architect.

Callicrates, or Kallikrates, may also refer to:

Kallikratis, an Cretan village
Callicrates of Sparta, a Spartan soldier
Callicrates of Samos, a Ptolemiac naval commander
Kallikrates, a character in the novel She: A History of Adventure
Callicrates (crater), a crater on Mercury
Kallikratis reform, an administrative plan in Greece